The 2015 Copa Venezuela was the 46th staging of the Copa Venezuela. The winner qualified for the 2016 Copa Sudamericana.

First round
Teams entering this round: 2 teams from Venezuelan Primera División and 12 teams from Venezuelan Segunda División.
First legs: July 8, 21, 22; Second legs: July 15, 29.

|-
!colspan=5|Central & Oriental Group

|}
|-
!colspan=5|Central & Occidental Group

|}

Second round
Teams entering this round: 14 teams from Venezuelan Primera División, 7 teams from Venezuelan Segunda División.
First legs: July 29, August 5; Second legs: August 5, 12, 13.

|-
!colspan=5|Central & Oriental Group

|-
!colspan=5|Central & Occidental Group

|}

Round of 16
Teams entering this round: Deportivo La Guaira (2014 Copa Venezuela champion), Deportivo Táchira (2014–15 Venezuelan Primera División champion).
First legs: August 19, 26; Second legs: August 26, September 2.

|-
!colspan=5|Central & Oriental Group

|-
!colspan=5|Central & Occidental Group

|}

Quarterfinals
First legs: September 9; Second legs: September 16, 23

|-
!colspan=5|Central & Oriental Group

|-
!colspan=5|Central & Occidental Group

|}

Semifinals
First legs: September 23, 30; Second legs: October 1, 7

|-
!colspan=5|Central & Oriental Group

|-
!colspan=5|Central & Occidental Group

|}

Final
First leg: October 21; Second leg: October 28

|}

External links
Official website of the Venezuelan Football Federation 
Copa Venezuela 2015, Soccerway.com

Copa Venezuela
Venezuela
2015 in Venezuelan football